Frisco High School is a public high school located in Frisco, Texas and is a part of the Frisco Independent School District. In 2015, the school was rated "Met Standard" by the Texas Education Agency.

History 
Frisco High School was founded in 1902. The original building no longer exists, but other previous locations still do: the Frisco ISD Student Opportunity Center (on Maple Street in "Center City" Frisco) was Frisco High School for many years; in fact, the words "Frisco High School" are still etched into the stone above the main entrance. In 1973, a new high school facility was built just north of this location and used for many years; this school building is now used as a middle school: Staley Middle School. Then, another new building, at Stonebrook Parkway and Parkwood Boulevard, was constructed in the 1990s; designed by architecture firm Corgan, it still serves as Frisco High School today.

At the beginning of the 2000s, Frisco's explosive population growth required the opening of a second high school named Centennial High in east Frisco, at Coit Road and Rolater Road. Frisco ISD's third high school, Wakeland High, opened in 2006 in northwest Frisco on Legacy Drive. This, like the opening of Centennial, also cut a large chunk out of Frisco High's attendance zone. The opening of now rival Wakeland High School, was vital, in that it relieved the infamous overcrowding at Frisco High; ever since Wakeland opened, FHS's total enrollment has always been below the building's capacity of 1800 students. However, the population of Frisco continued to grow; therefore, Rick Reedy High School opened in 2015, on Stonebrook Parkway just east of Teel Parkway, to relieve congestion at Frisco High. Reedy High School is Frisco ISD's eighth high school. The most recent attendance total for FHS is 1575 students, keeping the campus at its desired 5A Classification.

A significant addition and remodel to Frisco High School began during the summer of 2012, to increase the building's capacity to 2100 students and to update the school's facilities to the level of quality enjoyed by the other, newer high schools in the district. The project included the construction of a new auditorium, orchestra room, gymnasium, library, and parking lot, as well as an expansion of the cafeteria into the current auditorium. The previous marching band practice field was paved over to create the new parking lot, which was necessary because the new auditorium displaced a large number of the old parking spaces. The project was expected to be completed in summer of 2013, but was finished later in 2013.

School organizations

Athletics 
Prior to 2002 the athletic team was known as the "Coons", but the name was changed to "Raccoons" that year. Superintendent Rick Reedy and board member Jimmy Gaffney supported the change, while some area residents opposed the change. The change meant the sole water tower at the time was to be repainted. Prior to the vote the sole FISD athletic stadium at the time was changed from "Coons Stadium" to "FISD Memorial Stadium". In 2019 Coach Jeff Harbert Lead the Raccoons to Football District Champions.

The Frisco Raccoons compete in these sports 

 Baseball
 Basketball
 Cross Country
 Football - 2019 District Champions
 Golf
 Powerlifting
 Soccer
 Softball
 Swimming and Diving
 Tennis
 Track and Field
 Volleyball
 Wrestling

State titles
Girls Cross Country 
1982 (3A)
Softball 
2002 (4A)
Boys Swimming 
2005 (4A), 2006 (4A), 2008 (4A)
Girls Swimming 
2011 (4A)
Boys Track 
1981 (2A), 1982 (2A), 1983 (2A), 1984 (2A)

Notable alumni 
Jack Anderson, National Football League player for the Buffalo Bills
Ben Bishop, retired National Hockey League player. Played for the St. Louis Blues, Ottawa Senators, Tampa Bay Lightning, Los Angeles Kings, and Dallas Stars.
Matt Lepsis, former National Football League player for the Denver Broncos and Super Bowl XXXIII winner
Avi Nash, Actor (The Walking Dead, Learning to Drive)
Red Patterson, former Major League Baseball player

References

External links 
 Frisco High School

1902 establishments in Texas
Educational institutions established in 1902
High schools in Collin County, Texas
Frisco Independent School District high schools
Frisco, Texas